Klondike, Texas may refer to:

Klondike, Dawson County, Texas 
Klondike, Delta County, Texas 
Trotti, Texas, formerly Klondike

See also
Klondike (disambiguation)